Tim Mudde (born 23 February 1965), also known as Brigadier M or Sassem Tim, was active within the right wing radical movement in the Netherlands between the 1980s and the early 2010s. He was party secretary of the Centre Party '86 (an offshoot of the Centre Party) and like many other senior members of this party became active for Voorpost and later founded the Nationale Beweging, the nationalist mail order company Fenris and the nationalist internet radio station Radio Rapaille where he presented several shows.

Mudde played in the Rock Against Communism (RAC) band Brigade M and the Feyenoord themed Oi! band Foienoord.

He is the older brother of the political scientist Cas Mudde, who studies rightist movements.

In 1996 Mudde was one of the two founders of Brigade M, which initially was called Brigade Mussert referring to the personal bodyguards of Anton Mussert. Mudde was also a member of other RAC/Nationalistic bands: Dietse Patriotten, Die Fünfte Kolonne, Distrikt 217, H6, O.D.M., Oi-Die-Poes and Sassem Bootbois (later called Sassem Boot Boys). Mudde also had been involved with the RAC record companies Sassem Produkties and Muziek met wortels (Music with Roots). On 22 October 2005, he gave a speech for the National Alliance party about the Antifa.

Mudde considered himself to be a nationalist rather than a national socialist. In the 1980s and 1990s he was convicted several times for offenses dealing with hate speech.

References

1965 births
Living people
Politicians from Amsterdam
Dutch anti-communists
Dutch political activists